Songea Urban District is one of the five districts in the Ruvuma Region of Tanzania.  It is bordered to the north by the Songea Rural District, to the east by the Namtumbo District, to the south by Mozambique and to the west by the Mbinga District.

According to the 2002 Tanzania National Census, the population of the Songea Urban District was 131,336.

Wards

The Songea Urban District is administratively divided into 14 wards:

 Bomba Mbili
 Lizaboni
 Majengo 
 Matarawe
 Mateka
 Matogoro
 Mfaranyaki
 Misufini
 Mletele
 Mshangano
 Ruhuwiko
 Ruvuma
 Songea Mjini
 Subira

Sources
Songea Urban District Homepage for the 2002 Tanzania National Census

Districts of Ruvuma Region